Dance of the Wicked is heavy metal band Sister Sin's first studio album, released 2003. Recorded and produced in 2003 by Jan Jan at Triton Studios Gothenburg. Released and Distributed by Sleaszy Rider Records & EMI Greece Distribution.

Track listing

Band members
 Liv Jagrell — vocals (Hysterica)
 Jimmy Hiltula — guitar (Maleficio, Archangel)
 Strandh — bass
 Dave Sundberg — drums

Line Up "Dance Of The Wicked"

 Liv Jagrell — vocals (Hysterica)
 Johnny — guitar (Revolution Riot)
 Chris — bass
 Dave Sundberg — drums

References

 Encyclopedia Metallum: Sister Sin - Dance of the Wicked

Sister Sin albums
2003 debut albums